New York Mills Municipal Airport  is a city-owned, public-use airport located two nautical miles (2.3 mi, 3.7 km) southeast of the central business district of New York Mills, a city in Otter Tail County, Minnesota, United States.

Facilities and aircraft 
It has one runway designated 12/30 with a turf surface measuring 2,500 by 196 feet (762 x 60 m). For the 12-month period ending July 31, 2006, the airport had 500 general aviation aircraft operations, an average of 41 per month.

This airport no longer appears on satellite photos of the area. Its FAA record no longer exists. One report indicates that the airport closed in 2011.

References

External links 
 Aerial photo as of 20 April 1991 from USGS The National Map

Defunct airports in Minnesota
Airports in Minnesota
Transportation in Otter Tail County, Minnesota